The 1994–95 Scottish Second Division was won by Greenock Morton who, along with second placed Dumbarton, were promoted to the First Division. Meadowbank Thistle and Brechin City were relegated to the Third Division.

Table

References

External links 

 Scottish Football Archive

Scottish Second Division seasons
Scot
3